XEDKT-AM is a radio station on 1340 AM in Guadalajara, Jalisco. It is owned by Grupo Radiorama and carries a sports format known as Frecuencia Deportiva.

History
After testing beginning in 1938, XELW-AM received its concession on December 28, 1942. It was owned by Salvador Galindo de la Torre. When Radio Programas de México bought XELW in 1964, it became XEDKT-AM, part of its series of Grupo DK radio stations. Radiorama bought XEDKT in 1993.

In 2017, XEDKT and XEPJ-AM 1370 swapped formats. XEDKT picked up the Frecuencia Deportiva sports format, while the long-running Radio Ranchito Regional Mexican format moved to 1370.

References

Radio stations in Guadalajara
Sports radio stations in Mexico